John Melvin Thurston (January 16, 1919 – October 8, 1997) was an American professional basketball player. Thurston played for the Tri-Cities Blackhawks between 1946 and 1948 when they were still in the National Basketball League, then played for the Providence Steamrollers of the Basketball Association of America during the second half of the 1947–48 BAA season.

BAA career statistics

Regular season

References

External links

1919 births
1997 deaths
American men's basketball players
Basketball players from New York (state)
Canisius Golden Griffins men's basketball players
Guards (basketball)
People from Lockport, New York
Providence Steamrollers players
Tri-Cities Blackhawks players